Sedeh is a city in Fars Province, Iran.

Sedeh may also refer to:
Arianshahr, formerly Sedeh, a city in South Khorasan Province, Iran
Khomeyni Shahr, formerly Sedeh, a city in Isfahan Province, Iran
Sedeh Lenjan, also Sedeh, a city in Isfahan Province, Iran
Sedeh, Darab, a village in Fars Province, Iran
Sedeh, Fasa, a village in Fars Province, Iran
Sedeh, Khonj, a village in Fars Province, Iran
Sedeh, Gilan, a village in Rasht County, Gilan Province, Iran
Sedeh, Razavi Khorasan, a village in Khvaf County, Razavi Khorasan Province, Iran
 Sedeh District (Fars Province), an administrative subdivision of Iran
 Sedeh District (South Khorasan Province), an administrative subdivision of Iran
 Sedeh Rural District (Fars Province), an administrative subdivision of Iran
 Sedeh Rural District (Markazi Province), an administrative subdivision of Iran
 Sedeh Rural District (South Khorasan Province), an administrative subdivision of Iran